Copenhagen City Hall is the headquarters of the Copenhagen City Council as well as the Lord mayor of the Copenhagen Municipality, Denmark. The building is situated on City Hall Square in central Copenhagen.

Architecture
The current building was inaugurated in 1905. It was designed by the architect Martin Nyrop in the National Romantic style but with inspiration from the Siena City Hall. It is dominated by its richly ornamented front, the gilded statue of Absalon just above the balcony and the tall, slim clock tower. The latter is, at 105.6 metres, one of the tallest buildings in the generally low city of Copenhagen.

In addition to the tower clock, the City Hall also houses Jens Olsen's World Clock.

History

The current city hall was designed by architect Martin Nyrop and the design for the building was inspired by the city hall of Siena, Italy. Construction began in 1892 and the hall was opened on 12 September 1905.

Before the city hall moved to its present location, it was situated at Gammeltorv/Nytorv. The first city hall was in use from about 1479 until it burned down in the great Copenhagen fire of 1728.

The second city hall was built in 1728 and was designed by J.C. Ernst and J.C. Krieger. It burned down in the Copenhagen fire of 1795.

In 1815 a new city hall, designed by C.F.Hansen, was erected on Nytorv. It was intended to house both the city hall and a court. Today it is still in use as the Copenhagen Court House.

In 2007, the National Bank of Denmark issued a 20 DKK commemorative coin of the tower.

Cultural references
 Many of the hospital scenes where Lili Elbe (Eddie Redmayne) undergoes her operations in the 2015 drama film The Danish Girl were filmed in the atrium of Copenhagen City Hall.

Image gallery

References

External links

 Source

City and town halls in Copenhagen
Martin Nyrop buildings
Listed city and town halls in Denmark
Government buildings completed in 1905
Listed government buildings in Copenhagen
City Hall
Buildings and structures in Copenhagen Municipality
National Romantic architecture in Copenhagen
Art Nouveau architecture in Copenhagen
1905 establishments in Denmark